In ancient Greek religion Artemis Caryatis (Καρυᾶτις) was an epithet of Artemis that was derived from the small polis of Caryae in Laconia; there an archaic open-air temenos was dedicated to Carya, the Lady of the Nut-Tree, whose priestesses were called the caryatidai, represented on the Athenian Acropolis as the marble caryatids supporting the porch of the Erechtheum. The late accounts made of the eponymous Carya a virgin who had been transformed into a nut-tree, whether for her unchastity (with Dionysus) or to prevent her rape. The particular form of  veneration of Artemis at Karyai suggests that in pre-classical ritual Carya was  goddess of the nut tree who was later assimilated into the Olympian goddess Artemis. Pausanias noted that each year women performed a dance called the caryatis at a festival in honor of Artemis Caryatis called the Caryateia.

Notes

External links
Stewart, Michael. "People, Places Things: Caryatis"  Greek Mythology: From the Iliad to the Fall of the Last Tyrant
LacusCurtius.com: Caryatis, Caryatides

Greek goddesses
Nature goddesses
Epithets of Artemis
Religion in ancient Sparta